Don't Let's Start is a 1989 b-side and remix compilation album by the alternative rock band They Might Be Giants. It was only available in the UK and West Germany, and can be seen as the predecessor  to Miscellaneous T, which includes all of the tracks from this release and an additional track, "Hello Radio". The tracks on here mostly originate as b-sides from various EPs released such as Don't Let's Start  and (She Was A) Hotel Detective

All of the songs, with the exception of "(She Was A) Hotel Detective (Single Mix)", are included in Then: The Earlier Years, a compilation of the band's early material. Then also includes They Might Be Giants, and includes "Don't Let's Start (Single Mix)" in place of the album version with the rest of the tracks from They Might Be Giants.

Song notes
 "untitled" is not actually a song, but a snippet of a recording inadvertently left on the Dial-A-Song answering machine, in which a confused listener named Gloria talks to an unknown third party about the mystery of "There May Be Giants" and "There Must Be Giants", as she mistakenly refers to the band. It would later be referenced when Bryant Gumbel referred to them as "They Must Be Giants" when they performed "Your Racist Friend" on the Today Show to promote the release of Flood.
 "The Lady Is a Tramp" is a cover of a song from the Rodgers and Hart musical Babes in Arms.

Track listing
All songs by They Might Be Giants unless otherwise noted.
 "Don't Let's Start [single mix]" – 2:35
 "Hey, Mr. DJ, I Thought You Said We Had a Deal" – 3:48
 "Lady is a Tramp" (Lorenz Hart, Richard Rodgers) – 1:20
 "Birds Fly" – 1:25
 "The World's Address [Joshua Fried remix]" – 5:42
 "Nightgown of the Sullen Moon" – 1:59
 "I'll Sink Manhattan" – 2:32
 "It's Not My Birthday" – 1:52
 "Mr. Klaw" – 1:19
 "Kiss Me, Son of God [alternate version]" – 1:49
 "The Biggest One" – 1:22
 "For Science" – 1:19
 "Untitled" – 2:33
 "(She Was A) Hotel Detective [single mix]" – 2:20
 "The Famous Polka" – 1:33
 "When It Rains It Snows" – 1:33
 "We're the Replacements" – 1:50

External links
Don't Let's Start page at This Might Be A Wiki

They Might Be Giants compilation albums
1989 compilation albums
Rough Trade Records compilation albums